Theodore Roosevelt Pell (May 12, 1879 – August 18, 1967) was an American tennis player who played in the 1912 Summer Olympics.

Tennis career
Pell was the only U.S. participant in tennis events at the 1912 Summer Olympics. He played in the outdoor tournament and reached the third round in which he was defeated by the German Ludwig Heyden.  

His best performance at a Grand Slam tournament came in 1915 when he defeated Watson Washburn and Beals Wright to reach the semifinal of the U.S National Championships at Newport. In the semifinal he was beaten in straight sets by Maurice McLoughlin. 

He won the singles title at the New England tennis championships from 1907 until 1910. Pell won the singles title at the U.S. National Indoor Tennis Championships in 1907, 1909, and 1911 and the doubles title in 1905, 1909, 1911 and 1912.

He was inducted into the International Tennis Hall of Fame in 1966.

References

External links

International Tennis Hall of Fame

1879 births
1967 deaths
American male tennis players
International Tennis Hall of Fame inductees
Olympic tennis players of the United States
Tennis players at the 1912 Summer Olympics
Pell family
Tennis people from New York (state)